Frank "Frankie" Fredericks (born 2 October 1967) is a former track and field athlete from Namibia. Running in the 100 metres and 200 metres, he won four silver medals at the Olympic Games (two in 1992 and two in 1996), making him Namibia's only able-bodied Olympic medalist until Christine Mboma's silver medal at the 2020 Olympics in Tokyo. He also won gold medals at the World Championships, World Indoor Championships, All-Africa Games and Commonwealth Games. He is the world indoor record-holder for 200 metres, with a time of 19.92 seconds set in 1996.

Fredericks has broken 20 seconds for the 200 metres 24 times. He also holds the joint-third-fastest non-winning time for the 200 metres. In August 1996, Fredericks ran 19.68 seconds in the Olympic final in Atlanta, Georgia.

He is also the oldest man to have broken 20 seconds for the 200 metres. On 12 July 2002 in Rome, Fredericks won the 200 metres in a time of 19.99 seconds at the age of 34 years 283 days. He is currently serving as a council member in the IAAF.

On 3 March 2017, Fredericks was implicated in the IAAF corruption scandal, stemming from a large cash payment he received in 2009. The investigation is still to be concluded.

Education and early life

Fredericks was born in Windhoek on 2 October 1967, the only child of Riekie Fredericks, a seamstress, and Andries Kangootui, a farmer. He grew up in the city's Katutura township, his parents split up while he was little. In 1981 he switched to the Catholic school at Döbra to play competitive soccer. When he received a scholarship to complete his matric at Concordia College Fredericks took up athletics because the soccer was not strong at Concordia. He still played for Black Africa, one of the country's top teams.

After school he took up work at Rössing Uranium Ltd. in Swakopmund and soon got a partial scholarship at Brigham Young University in the US in 1987. There he studied computer science and graduated with a MBA.

During his college career, Fredericks earned numerous All-American citations and won three NCAA championships.

Athletics career
In 1990, after his country had become independent of South Africa, Fredericks could participate in international competition. At the World Championships in 1991, Fredericks won a silver medal in the 200 m, finishing behind Michael Johnson, and placed 5th in the 100 m. He then went on to The following year, at the Barcelona 1992 Summer Olympics, Fredericks became Namibia's first Olympic medalist when he finished second in both the 100 m and 200 m. He won the silver medal in the men's 100-metre dash, with a time of 10.02 seconds, just .06 seconds behind the gold medal winner. In 1993, in Stuttgart, he became the nation's first World Champion, winning the 200 m. At the 1994 Commonwealth Games, he won gold in the 200 m and bronze in the 100 m. His time of 19.97 seconds in the 200 metres is the current Commonwealth Games record. At the 1995 World Championships 100 m, after crossing the line he immediately went to help his friend Linford Christie who pulled a muscle in the race and signalled for help. This act of kindness endeared him to many (particularly British) athletics fans.

For the 1996 Summer Olympics, Fredericks was among the title favourites for both the 100 m and 200 m. He reached both finals, and again finished second in both. In the 100 m, he was beaten by Donovan Bailey, who set a new World Record, and in the 200 m he was beaten by Michael Johnson, who also set a new World Record. At the time, Fredericks's second-place run was the third fastest run in history, beaten only by Johnson (twice). At the 1998 Commonwealth Games in Kuala Lumpur, Malaysia, Frankie once again missed out on the chance of gold in the 100 m; he was beaten by Ato Boldon of Trinidad and Tobago.

Suffering from injuries, Fredericks had to withdraw from the 1999 and 2001 World Championships, and the 2000 Summer Olympics. When he arrived in Abuja to represent Namibia at the 2003 All-Africa Games, he was lauded by Nigerian supporters and came away with a silver medal. He then went on to win the 200 m at the inaugural Afro-Asian Games in 2003. In the 200 m final at the 2004 Summer Olympics he finished 4th.

After the end of 2004 outdoor season, Fredericks retired from competition. He had run the 100 m under 10 seconds 27 times, remained the 10th best in history until recently.

Outdoor records

Indoor records

IOC career

In 2004 Fredericks became a member of the International Olympic Committee. In 2009 Fredericks became the head of the Athletics Namibia in a controversial leadership contest. In 2012 Fredericks was nominated to be a member of the International Olympic Committee.

Frank Fredericks is a member of the 'Champions for Peace' club, a group of 54 famous elite athletes committed to serving peace in the world through sport, created by Peace and Sport, a Monaco-based international organisation.

Bribery investigation
On 3 March 2017, French newspaper Le Monde reported that Fredericks had received US$299,300 from Pamodzi Sports Consulting, a company owned by Papa Massata Diack (the son of disgraced former IAAF head Lamine Diack, who is currently facing corruption charges in France). The payment went to Yemi Limited, a company set up by Fredericks in the Seychelles, a tax haven, and was made on 2 Oct. 2009, the same day as Rio was announced as the winning bid for the 2016 Olympics. Fredericks has denied that the payment has anything to do with the Olympic bid, but instead says it was fees paid for consulting services he provided for "a relay championships" and marketing programs related to an African championships and other IAAF programs.

When the allegation was made Fredericks was the chair of the 2024 Olympic bid evaluation committee. On 6 March 2017, Fredericks stepped down from his position in the IAAF task force that is evaluating if or when to re-admit Russia's national sport body RusAF after a widespread doping scandal. On 7 March 2017, the Ethic Commission of the IOC recommended a provisionally suspension of Fredericks from his IOC-related duties. Prior to the IOC Executive meeting Fredericks while maintaining his innocence withdrew from his position as the Chair of the 2024 Olympic bidding process "in the best interests" of the process. Fredericks was replaced for the chair of 2024 Olympic bidding process by former FIBA secretary general Patrick Baumann.

Business career
After his athletics career Fredericks worked as business manager. He has also founded the Frank Fredericks Foundation in 1999, a non-profit organisation supporting talented athletes.

See also 
List of champions of Africa of athletics
IAAF doping controversy

References

External links
 
 Frank Fredericks at the International Olympic Committee (IOC)
 Website of the Frank Fredericks Foundation
 Fredericks says goodbye – a career tribute – IAAF website, 13 October 2004

1967 births
Living people
Sportspeople from Windhoek
Namibian male sprinters
Olympic athletes of Namibia
Olympic silver medalists for Namibia
Athletes (track and field) at the 1992 Summer Olympics
Athletes (track and field) at the 1996 Summer Olympics
Athletes (track and field) at the 2004 Summer Olympics
Medalists at the 1992 Summer Olympics
Medalists at the 1996 Summer Olympics
Commonwealth Games gold medallists for Namibia
Commonwealth Games silver medallists for Namibia
Commonwealth Games bronze medallists for Namibia
Commonwealth Games medallists in athletics
Athletes (track and field) at the 1994 Commonwealth Games
Athletes (track and field) at the 1998 Commonwealth Games
Athletes (track and field) at the 2002 Commonwealth Games
World Athletics Championships athletes for Namibia
World Athletics Championships medalists
World Athletics Indoor Championships medalists
International Olympic Committee members
BYU Cougars men's track and field athletes
Olympic silver medalists in athletics (track and field)
African Games gold medalists for Namibia
African Games medalists in athletics (track and field)
World Athletics indoor record holders
Goodwill Games medalists in athletics
Athletes (track and field) at the 1991 All-Africa Games
African Games silver medalists for Namibia
African Games bronze medalists for Namibia
World Athletics Indoor Championships winners
World Athletics Championships winners
Competitors at the 1994 Goodwill Games
Medallists at the 1994 Commonwealth Games
Medallists at the 1998 Commonwealth Games
Medallists at the 2002 Commonwealth Games